Elections to the Highland Council were held on 3 May 2007; the same day as elections to the Scottish Parliament and to the 31 other councils in Scotland. Previous elections to the council had been conducted using the single member plurality system (a.k.a. 'First Past the Post'). Changes implemented by the Local Governance (Scotland) Act 2004 meant that future local government elections were to be conducted using the Single Transferable Vote, beginning with those in 2007. The 80 Highland Councillors were now to be elected from 22 wards, returning either three or four members.

The election saw Independent councillors retain their plurality, despite losing a significant number of members, and the Liberal Democrats and Scottish National Party both increasing their representation, with that of the Labour Party decreasing. The Independent and SNP groups subsequently went into coalition to form the Administration of the council.

Election result

Ward results

North, West and Central Sutherland

Thurso

Wick

Landward Caithness

East Sutherland and Edderton

Wester Ross, Strathpeffer and Lochalsh

Cromarty Firth

Tain and Easter Ross

Dingwall and Seaforth

Black Isle

Eilean a' Cheò

Caol and Mallaig

Aird and Loch Ness

Inverness West

Inverness Central

Inverness Ness-side

Inverness Millburn

Culloden and Ardersier

Nairn

Inverness South

Badenoch and Strathspey

Fort William and Ardnamurchan

Post-election changes
On 6 May 2007, Badenoch and Strathspey Cllr Gregor Rimell became a Liberal Democrat and ceased to be an Independent
On 26 October 2007, Tain and Easter Ross Cllr Richard Durham became an Independent after leaving the Liberal Democrats
On 12 December 2007, Tain and Easter Ross Cllr Alan Torrance became a member of the Scottish National Party and ceased to be an Independent
On 3 April 2008, Landward Caithness Cllr David Bremner became an Independent, separate from the Administration, after being expelled from the Scottish National Party
In 2008, Wick Cllr Graeme Smith became a member of the Independent Members Group after leaving the Liberal Democrats
On 13 March 2009, North, West and Central Sutherland Cllr Linda Munro became a Liberal Democrat and ceased to be an Independent
On 17 February 2011 Inverness Central Cllr Janet Campbell became a member of the Independent Members Group after leaving the Liberal Democrats.
On 17 February 2011 Culloden and Ardersier Cllr Glynis Sinclair became an Independent after leaving the Liberal Democrats. She joined the Scottish National Party on 24 May 2011

2007-2011 by-elections

Inverness West
On 23 April 2009 the Liberal Democrat's Alasdair Christie won a by-election which arose following the death of former Independent Councillor Jimmy MacDonald on 31 January 2009

Wick
On 7 April 2011 the SNP's Gail Ross won a by-election which arose following the resignation of Independent Councillor Katrina MacNab

Tain and Easter Ross
On 9 June 2011 Independent Fiona Robertson won a by-election which arose following the death of SNP Councillor Alan Torrance

Inverness South
On 3 November 2011 the Liberal Democrat's Carolyn Caddick won a by-election which arose following the resignation of Labour Councillor John Holden

References

2007
2007 Scottish local elections